WBCY (89.5 FM) is a radio station licensed to Archbold, Ohio. The station rebroadcasts WBCL, the Christian adult contemporary music station owned and operated by Taylor University in Fort Wayne, Indiana. The station's transmitter is located near the corner of County Roads W and 22, southeast of Archbold.

References

External links
 
 
 
 
 

BCY
BCY
Taylor University
Radio stations established in 1992
1992 establishments in Ohio
Contemporary Christian radio stations in the United States